The 2004–05 DFB-Pokal was the 62nd season of the annual German football cup competition. 64 teams competed in the tournament of six rounds which began on 20 August 2004 and ended on 28 May 2005. In the final FC Bayern Munich defeated FC Schalke 04 2–1, thereby claiming their twelfth title and completing the double.

Matches

First round

* Match awarded 2–0 to 1. FC Köln II as VfL Wolfsburg fielded an ineligible player

Second round

Round of 16

Quarter-finals

Semi-finals

Final

Top scorers 

The following were the top scorers of the 2004–05 DFB-Pokal.

References

External links
 Official site of the DFB 
 Kicker.de 

2004-05
2004–05 in German football cups